Sadie Sarah Jocelyn Dolan Alexandru (born December 2, 1977) is an American actress and model. Alexandru is best known for playing Scarlett, secretary for media buyer Harry Crane on AMC's drama series Mad Men.

Early life
Sadie Alexandru was  born in New York City and had a passion for ballet from her younger days. She received her Bachelor of Fine Arts degree in Acting from The Mason Gross School of the Arts at Rutgers University. She also studied at the London Academy of Theater under Patron Dame Judi Dench, and at the William Esper Studio in New York City. Alexandru took up permanent residency in Los Angeles, California in January 2006. Her LA training includes: on-camera studies at the Steve Eastin Studio and stunt training at the Academy of Theatrical Combat.

Career
Alexandru is well known for the original “What Happens in Vegas, Stays in Vegas” commercial. She's landed 24 national commercials including ads for Comcast, Jared Jewelers, Swiffer, Coors, Wendy's, Merck, Turbo Tax, Staples, 1-800-Flowers, Milky Way, Hasbro and Bud Light.

Alexandru's first major show was the popular soap opera All My Children and her character's name was Sylvia. She was also a recurring guest star in CBS's long running soap opera As the World Turns and in ABC comedy Carpoolers. Her television credits also includes Cinemax's thriller noir "Femme Fatales, upcoming musical Kittens in a Cage, Laura Prepon's Neighbros.

In 2012, Alexandru made her debut in the fifth season of AMC's critically acclaimed Emmy Award winning series Mad Men'' as the new sassy SCDP secretary, Scarlett.

Her film credits include the popular action film "Gamer", "Broken Horses" and "Lucy in the Sky Diamond." She is playing the lead role of Firoozeh in the upcoming epic, "Sinbad: The Fifth Voyage." Sadie also co-produced and played the role of Natalie Cloonan in the critically acclaimed independent film "Act Naturally," which won the Audience Award for Best Feature-Length Narrative in 2012 at both the Los Angeles United Film Festival and its sister festival, the San Francisco United Film Festival.

She is also recognized for her theater works which include the Ovation Award-nominated hit "Love Sucks".

Filmography

Film

Television

Video Game

References

External links
 
 

1977 births
Actresses from New York City
American film actresses
American stage actresses
American television actresses
American people of Romanian descent
Living people
Actresses from Los Angeles
21st-century American actresses